Knowlton is an unincorporated community in Ringgold County, Iowa, United States.

Notable person
Yam Yaryan, Major League Baseball catcher, was born in Knowlton.

References

Unincorporated communities in Ringgold County, Iowa
Unincorporated communities in Iowa